The Quasi-War was an undeclared naval war fought from 1798 to 1800 between the United States and the French First Republic, primarily in the Caribbean and off the East Coast of the United States. The ability of Congress to authorize military action without a formal declaration of war was later confirmed by the Supreme Court and formed the basis of many similar actions since, including American participation in the Vietnam War and the 1991 Gulf War.        

In 1793, Congress suspended repayments of French loans incurred during the American Revolutionary War. The dispute escalated further due to different interpretations of the 1778 treaties of Alliance and Commerce between the two countries. France, then engaged in the 1792–1797 War of the First Coalition, which included Great Britain, viewed the 1794 Jay Treaty between the United States and Britain as incompatible with those treaties, and retaliated by seizing American ships trading with Britain.

Diplomatic negotiations failed to resolve these differences, and in October 1796 French privateers began attacking merchant ships sailing in American waters, regardless of nationality. The dissolution of Federal military forces following independence left the US unable to mount an effective response and by October 1797, over 316 American ships had been captured. In March 1798, Congress reassembled the United States Navy and in July authorized the use of military force against France.

In addition to a number of individual ship actions, by 1799 American losses had been significantly reduced through informal cooperation with the Royal Navy, whereby merchant ships from both nations were allowed to join each other's convoys. Diplomatic negotiations between the US and France continued, the establishment of the French Consulate in November 1799 led to the Convention of 1800, which ended the war.

Background
Under the Treaty of Alliance (1778), the United States had agreed to protect the French West Indies in return for their support in the American Revolutionary War. As the treaty had no termination date, France claimed this obligation included defending them against Great Britain and the Dutch Republic during the 1792 to 1797 War of the First Coalition. Despite popular enthusiasm for the French Revolution, especially among anti-British Jeffersonians, there was little support for this in Congress. Neutrality allowed New England shipowners to earn huge profits evading the British blockade, while Southern plantation owners feared the example set by France's abolition of slavery in 1794.

In 1793, Congress suspended repayment of French loans incurred during the Revolutionary War, arguing the execution of Louis XVI and establishment of the French First Republic rendered existing agreements void. They further argued American military obligations under the Treaty of Alliance applied only to a "defensive conflict" and thus did not apply, since France had declared war on Britain and the Dutch Republic. To ensure the US did not become involved, Congress passed the Neutrality Act of 1794, while President George Washington issued an Executive Order forbidding American merchant ships from arming themselves. France accepted these acts, but on the basis of 'benevolent neutrality', which they interpreted as allowing French privateers access to US ports, and the right to sell captured British ships in American prize courts, but not vice versa. However, the US viewed 'neutrality' as the right to provide the same privileges to both.

These differences were further exacerbated in November 1794 when the US and Britain signed a new trade agreement, which contradicted the 1778 Commercial Treaty granting France "most favoured nation" status. The Jay Treaty resolved outstanding issues from the American Revolution, and expanded trade between the two countries; between 1794 and 1801, American exports to Britain nearly tripled in value, from US$33 million to $94 million.

As a result, in late 1796 French privateers began seizing American ships trading with the British. An effective response was hampered by the almost complete lack of a United States Navy, whose last warship had been sold in 1785, leaving only a small flotilla belonging to the United States Revenue Cutter Service and a few neglected coastal forts. This allowed French privateers to roam virtually unchecked; from October 1796 to June 1797, they captured 316 ships, 6% of the entire American merchant fleet, causing losses of $12 to $15 million. On March 2, 1797, the Directory issued a decree permitting the seizure of any neutral shipping without a role d'equipage, a crew manifest which listed the nationalities of each crewmen. Since virtually no American merchantman carried such a document, this effectively initiated a French commerce war on American shipping.

Efforts to resolve the conflict through diplomacy ended in the 1797 dispute known as the XYZ Affair. However, the hostilities created support for establishing a limited naval force, and on June 18, President John Adams appointed Benjamin Stoddert the first Secretary of the Navy. On July 7, 1798, Congress approved the use of force against French warships in American waters, but wanted to ensure conflict did not escalate beyond these strictly limited objectives. As a result, it was called a "limited" or "Quasi-War" and led to political debate over whether it was constitutional. A series of rulings by the Supreme Court of the United States established its legality and confirmed the ability of the US to conduct undeclared war or "police actions".

Forces and strategy

Since battleships were expensive to build and required highly specialised construction facilities, in 1794 Congress compromised by ordering six large frigates. The provision of naval stores and equipment by the British allowed these to be built relatively quickly, and all saw action during the war.

The US Navy was further reinforced by so-called 'subscription ships', privately funded vessels provided by individual cities. Primarily intended to attack foreign shipping, these were noted for their speed, and earned huge profits for their owners; the  captured over 80 enemy vessels, including the French corvette .

With most of the French fleet confined to home ports by the Royal Navy, Secretary Stoddert was able to concentrate his forces against the limited number of frigates and smaller vessels that evaded the blockade and reached the Caribbean. The US also needed convoy protection, and while there was no formal agreement with the British, considerable co-operation took place at a local level. The two navies shared a signal system, and allowed their merchantmen to join each other's convoys, most of which were provided by the British, who had four to five times more escorts available.

This allowed the US Navy to concentrate on attacking French privateers, most of very shallow draft and armed with between one and twenty guns. Operating from French and Spanish bases in the Caribbean, particularly Guadeloupe, they made opportunistic attacks on passing ships, before escaping back into port. To counter those tactics, the US used similarly sized vessels from the United States Revenue Cutter Service, as well as commissioning their own privateers.

The Revenue cutter , commanded by Edward Preble, made two cruises to the West Indies and captured ten prizes. Preble turned command of Pickering over to Benjamin Hillar, who captured the much larger and more heavily armed French privateer lEgypte Conquise after a nine-hour battle. In September 1800, Hillar, Pickering, and her entire crew were lost at sea in a storm. Preble next commanded the frigate , which he sailed around Cape Horn into the Pacific to protect U.S. merchantmen in the East Indies. He recaptured several U.S. ships that had been seized by French privateers.

For various reasons, the role of the Royal Navy was minimised both at the time and later; the first significant study of the war by US naval historian Gardner W. Allen in 1909 focused exclusively on ship-to-ship actions, and this is how the war is often remembered. However, historian Michael Palmer argues American naval operations cannot be understood in isolation and when operating in the Caribbean

Significant naval actions

From the perspective of the US Navy, the Quasi-War consisted of a series of ship-to-ship actions in US coastal waters and the Caribbean; one of the first was the Capture of La Croyable on 7 July 1798 by the  outside Egg Harbor, New Jersey. On 20 November, a pair of French frigates, Insurgente and Volontaire, captured the schooner , commanded by Lieutenant William Bainbridge; Retaliation would be recaptured on 28 June 1799.

On 9 February 1799, the frigate  captured the French Navy's frigate L'Insurgente. By 1 July, under the command of Stephen Decatur,  had been refitted and repaired and embarked on its mission to patrol the South Atlantic coast and West Indies in search of French ships which were preying on American merchant vessels.

On 1 January 1800, a convoy of American merchant ships and their escort, United States naval schooner , engaged a squadron of armed barges manned by French-allied Haitians known as picaroons off the coast of present-day Haiti. On 1 February, the American frigate  severely damaged but did not capture the French frigate La Vengeance off the coast of Saint Kitts. In early May, Captain Silas Talbot organized a naval expedition to Puerto Plata on the island of Hispaniola in order to harass French shipping, capturing the Spanish coastal fort at Puerto Plata and a French corvette. Following the French invasion of Curaçao in July, the American sloops  and  began a blockade of the island in September that led to a French withdrawal. On 12 October, the frigate  captured the corvette . 

On 25 October, the  defeated the French brig Flambeau near the island of Dominica in the Caribbean Sea. Enterprise also captured eight privateers and freed eleven U.S. merchant ships from captivity, while  captured the French privateers Deux Amis and Diane and liberated numerous American merchant ships. Although overall USN losses were light, by the time the war ended in 1800, the French had seized over 2,000 American merchant ships.

Conclusion of hostilities
By late 1800, the United States Navy and the Royal Navy, combined with a more conciliatory diplomatic stance by the government of First Consul Napoleon Bonaparte, had reduced the activity of the French privateers and warships. The Convention of 1800, signed on 30 September, ended the Quasi-War. It affirmed the rights of Americans as neutrals upon the sea and abrogated the alliance with France of 1778. However, it failed to provide compensation for the $20 million "French Spoliation Claims" of the United States. The agreement between the two nations implicitly ensured that the United States would remain neutral toward France in the wars of Napoleon and ended the "entangling" French alliance. This alliance had been viable only between 1778 and 1783.

Explanatory notes

Citations

General and cited references

Further reading 
 Bowman, Albert Hall. The struggle for neutrality: Franco-American diplomacy during the Federalist era (1974), online free
 
  
  A history of the use of the term "Quasi-War" in the years after 1800.
 
 
 
 
 Nash, Howard Pervear. The Forgotten Wars: The Role of the US Navy in the Quasi War with France and the Barbary Wars 1798–1805 (AS Barnes, 1968)

External links

 "Selected Bibliography of The Quasi-War with France"  compiled by the United States Army Center of Military History
 U.S. Department of State "The XYZ Affair and the Quasi-War with France, 1798–1800"
 "U.S. treaties and federal legal documents re 'Quasi-War with France 1791–1800'", compiled by the Lillian Goldman Law Library of Yale Law School

 
1798 in France
1798 in the United States
1799 in France
1799 in the United States
1800 in France
1800 in the United States
18th century in France
18th century in the United States
Conflicts in 1798
Conflicts in 1799
Conflicts in 1800
United States Marine Corps in the 18th and 19th centuries
Wars involving France
Wars involving the United States